Wedge bonding is a kind of wire bonding which relies by the application of ultrasonic power and force to form bonds. It is a popular method and is commonly used in the semiconductor industry.

Semiconductor device fabrication
Packaging (microfabrication)
Articles containing video clips